The Rural Municipality of Willowdale No. 153 is a rural municipality (RM) in the southeast portion of the Canadian province of Saskatchewan within Census Division No. 5 and  Division No. 1.

History 

The RM of Willowdale No. 153 incorporated as a rural municipality on January 1, 1913.

Heritage properties
New Finland is a Finnish speaking block settlement locates within the RM. The St. John's New Finland Lutheran Church, with an active congregation, was officially declared a municipal heritage property on May 4, 2007. The church building was built in 1907, and then the community moved it in 1934 by steam engine to the present location five miles south of the original construction site. This arduous undertaking necessitated sawing the church in half.

The RM's municipal office building, located at 711 Lalonde Street in Whitewood, was originally built in 1935 to house Whitewood's post office. The building is a designated heritage property. The building was constructed by the federal government as a make-work project during the depression era.

Geography 
The burrowing owl (athene cunicularia), an endangered animal, makes its home in this area, and the monarch butterfly (danaus plexippus) is also monitored in this area by conservationists.

Communities and localities 
The following urban municipalities are surrounded by the RM.

Towns
Whitewood

Demographics 

Government 
The RM of Willowdale No. 153 is governed by an elected municipal council and an appointed administrator that meets on the second Wednesday of every month. The reeve of the RM is Larry Sippola while its administrator is Andrea Smyth. The RM's office is located in Whitewood.

References 

 
Willowdale
Division No. 5, Saskatchewan